Reach For The Skies (Chinese: 不平凡的平凡) is a 150-episode drama series produced by Mediacorp Channel 8. It stars Bryan Wong, Kym Ng, Pan Lingling, Yao Wenlong, Joey Swee, Zhang Zhenhuan and He Yingying as the cast of this series.

The show replaced the second half of the 7.00 pm drama timeslot, airing weekdays from April 4, 2018, 7.30 pm to 8.00 pm on weekdays making it the sixth long-form half an hour drama airing together with news-current affairs programme Hello Singapore at 6.30pm.

Casts

 Chen Shucheng as Fang Shouyi 方守义 or Uncle Yi (义叔) Chen portrays as Fang Shouyi, a gang leader.
 Bryan Wong as Fang Zixin 方自新 Wong portrays as Fang Zixin, Fang Shouyi's son, who is an ex-convict and a Hope Training Centre's instructor.

Hong (Biao) Family

Wu (Simei) Family

Supporting Casts

Cameo Appearance

Original Sound Track (OST)

Awards & Nominations

References 

2018 Singaporean television series debuts
Channel 8 (Singapore) original programming